Judolia sexmaculata is a species of beetle in the family Cerambycidae. It was described by Carl Linnaeus in his landmark 1758 10th edition of Systema Naturae.

References

S
Beetles described in 1758
Taxa named by Carl Linnaeus